Howard Griffith (born November 17, 1968) is a former American football fullback who spent 11 seasons in the NFL (1991–2001). While at the University of Illinois, Griffith set the NCAA record for touchdowns in a game with eight. It occurred on September 22, 1990, against Southern Illinois University in a 56–21 Illinois win.  Raised in Chicago, Griffith attended now defunct Mendel Catholic Prep High School of the Chicago Catholic League until his sophomore year. For his junior year, he transferred to Julian High School, where he was an All-City performer.

Biography
Griffith was drafted in the ninth round of the 1991 NFL Draft by the Indianapolis Colts, but never played a regular-season game for the Colts.  Griffith made his NFL debut with the Los Angeles Rams in 1993.  He played two seasons with the Rams, and then played two seasons with the Carolina Panthers after being selected in the 1995 NFL Expansion Draft.

In 1997, Griffith joined the Denver Broncos, and played five seasons for the Broncos primarily as a blocking back for Terrell Davis.  He didn't get very many rushing attempts, but was often used as a receiver out of the backfield, recording  27 receptions in 1996 and 26 in 1999.  With the Broncos, Griffith won two Super Bowl rings in Super Bowl XXXII and Super Bowl XXXIII.  Griffith was a big contributor in the Broncos Super Bowl XXXIII win, scoring two rushing touchdowns in the game.  He also made a key 23-yard reception in the final quarter of Super Bowl XXXII, setting up Denver's final touchdown of the game.  While playing for the Broncos, Howard earned the nickname "The Human Plow" due to his successful blocking for Davis.

Griffith retired from the NFL at the start of the 2002 season, due to a neck injury sustained in the 2001 preseason that caused him to miss the entire 2001 campaign.  His final totals over his 11 NFL seasons include 351 rushing yards and three touchdowns, along with 122 receptions for 844 yards and nine touchdowns.

Today, Griffith works as a football analyst. He is one of the lead in-studio analysts for the Big Ten Network, giving his weekly analysis of Big 10 football. In 2005, he was an analyst for the NFL and NFL Europe football leagues, as he commentated games that were broadcast by Fox and the NFL Networks.  He is the author of the 2001 book Laying it on the Line.

His son Houston committed to Notre Dame in 2018.

References

External links
 

1967 births
Living people
American football fullbacks
Carolina Panthers players
Denver Broncos players
Illinois Fighting Illini football players
Indianapolis Colts players
Los Angeles Rams players
Players of American football from Chicago
African-American players of American football
20th-century African-American sportspeople
21st-century African-American sportspeople